Hakone Park ( = Onshi Hakone Koen, meaning Royally Given Hakone Park) is a prefectural park, located in Hakone Town, Kanagawa Prefecture, Japan. It occupies the 15.9 hectare Tōgshima peninsula jotting out to Lake Ashi.

Hakone Park was established as one of the Emperor and Empress's villas in 1886, was given to the public in 1946, and became a prefectural park. It is one of the popular places for recreational outing in Fuji-Hakone-Izu National Park.

See also   
Ueno Park

References

External link

(Onshi) Hakone Park (Kanagawa Prefecture) in Japanese
(Onshi) Hakone Park (Designated Management Company)

Parks and gardens in Kanagawa Prefecture
Hakone, Kanagawa
Tourist attractions in Kanagawa Prefecture
Registered Monuments of Japan